Joyce Marilyn Meyer Sommers (July 20, 1927 – December 18, 1996), also known as the Christmas Tree Lady, was a formerly unidentified American woman who died by suicide in a cemetery in Annandale, Virginia on December 18, 1996. She was identified more than 25 years later on May 11, 2022.

Life
Sommers was born on July 20, 1927 to Arthur Meyer and Margaret Meyer and had four siblings. She was raised on a farm in Davenport, Iowa and later attended Iowa State University. Sommers then relocated to Los Angeles to work at Seventeen magazine while living with an aunt. After she left the magazine in the 1950s, she taught second grade at a local Catholic elementary school. Around that time Sommers began seeing a psychiatrist whose treatments of encouraging one to blame their own family, especially the mother, for their problems alienated Sommers from her family.

In the 1960s, Sommers' mother visited her in California where she had a 24 hour "confrontation session" with her daughter. Sommers accused her of being a bad parent which saddened her mother. Sommers then moved to Seattle and married James E. Sommers, but she didn't inform her family of the event. The couple didn't have children and eventually divorced in 1977. Sommers then moved to a trailer park in Tucson, Arizona where she was described as being unhappy according to her siblings. In the early 80's, Sommers' siblings all visited her; she asked them to help build her a home. However, the siblings refused saying that they couldn't do that which greatly upset Sommers. This visit was the last time Sommers was seen by her family. They believed Sommers joined a cult and later hired a private investigator to locate her, but this failed. There were some hints that Sommers moved to the East Coast, but these leads went nowhere. Examinations of police databases indicated that she may have lived in Northern Virginia sometime in 1996, possibly in Alexandria. Public records on LexisNexis also revealed an address for Sommers in downtown Washington D.C, a townhouse on Massachusetts Avenue which has since been incorporated into another building. 

In the early 1990s, Sommers's brother, Larry, traveled to Tucson in an attempt to locate her, only to find her trailer abandoned. In it, he discovered 4 copies of a book, "The Target Child", written by Sommers. In the book, she wrote her account of a supposedly traumatic upbringing. Sommers' sister, Clough, didn't believe their parents were abusive or that any of the siblings suffered growing up.

Suicide
On December 18, 1996, a little after 9 a.m., workers at the Pleasant Valley Memorial Park Cemetery in Annandale, Virginia, discovered the body of a woman. She was found near the section of the cemetery where infants and children are buried. They then called police. It was discovered that she put a bag over her head and secured the bag with tape. She was wearing a red shirt, a sweater, blue pants, and an Eddie Bauer jacket. An  Christmas tree and her backpack were found next to her. She was also found to be listening to a cassette tape using a tape player and headphones. Two notes were found with one saying, "Now I lay me down to sleep, soon to drift to the eternal deep. And though I die and shall not wake, sleep sweeter will be than this life I forsake." The second message read "Deceased by own hand. Prefer no autopsy. Please order cremation, with funds provided. Thank you, Jane Doe." Two $50 bills were found with her. One of the bills was for the cemetery, and the other bill was for the coroner. Authorities determined that she committed suicide by suffocation, but were unable to identify her.

Investigation
Alcohol and diazepam were found in her system. Hoping to find a match, authorities looked at many nearby cases which involved missing people, but they failed. In 2000, a colored sketch of the Christmas Tree Lady was released.

In January 2022, the Texas lab, Othram, conducted tests using DNA. The tests were made possible by donations. In May 2022, Othram discovered that a man, David Meyer, could be the Christmas Tree Lady's brother. After David Meyer looked at the drawing of the Christmas Tree Lady, he was unable to say whether or not she was his sister because the last time he saw her was decades ago. The detectives were then told to go to his sister, Clough. After seeing the drawing, Clough said that she was definitely Joyce. DNA was taken from Clough, and the Christmas Tree Lady was identified as Sommers. Detectives were unable to find any connection between Sommers and any of the graves. Clough believed that her sister never bore children despite a large scar across her stomach which possibly indicated a Caesarean section.

Clough theorized that Sommers chose the children's section of the cemetery as a symbolic nod to her belief that parental abuse can permanently damage children.

See also
Lyle Stevik
Mary Anderson (decedent)
Unidentified decedent

References

1996 in Virginia
1996 suicides
December 1996 events in the United States
Annandale, Virginia
Female suicides
Suicides by asphyxiation
Suicides in Virginia